Crookgate Bank is a village in County Durham, in England. It is situated to the east of Burnopfield.

References

Villages in County Durham